The 2013 COSAFA Cup, sponsored by South African Breweries and officially named the 2013 COSAFA Castle Cup, was the 14th edition of the COSAFA Cup, an international football competition consisting of national teams of member nations of the Council of Southern Africa Football Associations (COSAFA).  It was hosted by Zambia in July 2013.

Participants
Comoros and Madagascar did not enter for unknown reasons.  While Kenya and Tanzania, both members of the Council for East and Central Africa Football Associations (CECAFA) were invited.

On 17 May 2013, Tanzania withdrew, citing conflicting schedules with African Nations Championship qualifiers and the Kagame Interclub Cup.  The Tanzanian and Ugandan Federations were unable to agree on a new date for the African Nations Championship qualifying game due to a conflict with the FUFA elections.  Tanzania were replaced with Equatorial Guinea, a member of the Central African Football Federations' Union (UNIFFAC), but they withdrew from the competition on 24 June.

The FIFA World Rankings from 11 April 2013 were used to decide which teams receive a bye to the quarter-final stage.

Venues
Prior to the start of the competition, the Zambian government did not provide funds to make the Godfrey 'Ucar' Chitalu 107 Stadium in Kabwe suitable for the competition. As a result, those games were relocated to the Nkana Stadium in Kitwe.

Squads

Group stage
All times listed are local (UTC+2).

Group A

Group B

†This fixture was originally scheduled to take place on 7 July at 15:00 (UTC+2). However, Kenya's arrival at the tournament was delayed due to the players' league commitments.

Knockout stage
Zambia, South Africa, Angola, Zimbabwe, Mozambique and Malawi all received a bye to this stage.

Quarter-finals

Plate competition

Plate semi-final

Plate final

Semi-final

Third place play-off

Final

Awards
The following were the individual awards:

Goalscorers
4 goals
 Jerome Ramatlhakwane

3 goals

 Mabululu
 Thapelo Tale
 Jean Stephan Pierre
 Sonito

2 goals

 Edwin Lavatsa
 Ralekoti Mokhahlane
 Ananias Gebhardt
 Yves Zialor
 Hlompho Kekana
 Tendai Ndoro

1 goal

 Abdul
 Lemponye Tshireletso
 Jockins Atudo
 Paul Kiongera
 Nkau Lerotholi
 Phillip Letsie
 Tlali Maile
 Motlalepula Mofolo
 Tsepo Seturumane
 Gastin Simkonda
 Gurty Calambé
 Fabrice Pithia
 Pinehas Jakob
 Petrus Shitembi
 Willy Stephanus
 Neville Tjiueza
 Sadney Urikhob
 Mandla Masango
 Jabulani Shongwe
 Jimmy Chisenga
 Kabaso Chongo
 Bornwell Mwape
 Alex Ngonga
 Moses Phiri
 Masimba Mambare

1 own goal
 Ito (playing against Malawi)
 Edwin Olerile (playing against Kenya)
 Maxwell Nyamupanedengu (playing against Malawi)

References

External links
COSAFA Cup 2013 at COSAFA.com

COSAFA Cup
Cosafa
Cosafa
International sports competitions hosted by Zambia